Xu Xiaofei (born March 7, 1982, in Zhengzhou), is a Chinese footballer who currently plays for Minami Club in the Shikoku Adult League.

Club career

Career in Japan
While Xu Xiaofei grew up in the city of Zhengzhou in the province of Henan, his mother would move him to Japan as a 10-year-old child. He would continue to live and study sports in Japan where he would graduate from university and then start his football career with second division side Consadole Sapporo in the 2005 J. League season. This was, however, short-lived, and he would move to fourth-tier side Kamatamare Sanuki, where he gained more playing time and caught the eye of third-tier teams Gainare Tottori and then Mitsubishi Mizushima FC, yet none of these moves were particularly successful.

Return to China
Xu Xiaofei would return to China and move to his local football team Henan Construction halfway through the 2009 Chinese Super League season. But in a medical examination after the 2009 league season, he was diagnosed with cardiac arrhythmia, then he announced his retirement in his blog.

Club statistics

References

External links

j-league #23 
ガイナーレ鳥取 
Player stats at sohu.com 

1982 births
Living people
People from Zhengzhou
Chinese footballers
Footballers from Henan
Chinese expatriate footballers
Expatriate footballers in Japan
Hokkaido Consadole Sapporo players
Kamatamare Sanuki players
Gainare Tottori players
Mitsubishi Mizushima FC players
J2 League players
Japan Football League players
Henan Songshan Longmen F.C. players
Chinese Super League players
Association football midfielders